Paul Bernard Rudish (born September 27, 1968) is an American animator, storyboard artist, writer, and voice actor, originally known for his art, writing, and design work at Cartoon Network Studios on series created by Genndy Tartakovsky. He went on to co-create the series Sym-Bionic Titan and, in 2013, developed, wrote, storyboarded, executively produced, and directed a revival of Mickey Mouse short cartoons.

Career

Paul's father, Rich Rudish, created the character Rainbow Brite for Hallmark and was art director for the 1985 animated film Rainbow Brite and the Star Stealer. Paul went into animation, too, studying in the Character Animation program at California Institute of the Arts. Rudish did character design and storyboard work early in his career, most notably for Batman: The Animated Series. When Cartoon Network started producing new shows as Cartoon Network Studios, he quickly expanded into new roles on series created by Genndy Tartakovsky and Craig McCracken. He wrote, designed characters, or directed art for episodes of series including Dexter's Laboratory, The Powerpuff Girls, and Samurai Jack. 

He moved up to directing art for the entire production of the 2003 Star Wars: Clone Wars miniseries. 

In 2010, Rudish earned his first co-creator credit for the series Sym-Bionic Titan, which he co-created with Tartakovsky and Samurai Jack writer Bryan Andrews. He wrote the series and also designed the characters and Sym-Bionic Units. Around the same time, he provided development art for the first season and second season opener of My Little Pony: Friendship Is Magic.

Mickey Mouse 

Rudish's next project saw him work with characters not created by either him, Tartakovsky or McCracken: Mickey Mouse and friends. Rudish created, executive-produced and directed a new series of 3.5-minute episodes titled simply Mickey Mouse. The series uses the character designs and personalities from the earliest Mickey, Donald Duck, and Goofy shorts, even using lesser known characters such as Clarabelle Cow. 

Many of the shorts use a classic story structure in which Mickey must overcome a series of obstacles to achieve a seemingly simple goal, though some highlight the more playful aspects of animation, such as Mickey's cartoony evasive moves in "No Service" or the ability of characters to detach and reattach their ears (complete with temporary deafness) in "Bad Ear Day". Despite the retro feel, the developers used modern animation techniques and tools. 

Further, they did update some elements, most notably the vivid, detailed backgrounds and super-smooth animation in fast-paced scenes. They also took stylistic risks, basing some episodes entirely in foreign countries. In most of these, the characters speak sparingly, if at all, while in "Croissant de Triomphe", set in Paris, the characters speak entirely in French. The first episode, "No Service", was released on June 28, 2013 on Disney Channel, Disney.com and WATCH Disney Channel.

A sequel series The Wonderful World of Mickey Mouse, premiered on November 18, 2020 (Mickey's 92nd birthday) on Disney+ with Rudish returning for the show.

Filmography

Film 

 Rainbow Brite and the Star Stealer (1985), character designer
 The Powerpuff Girls Movie (2002), screenwriter, story artist
Sky High (2005), illustrator

Television 
 2 Stupid Dogs (1993–1995), writer, art director, story artist, animator
 Secret Squirrel (1993)
 Dexter's Laboratory (1996–2003), character designer and art director
 The Powerpuff Girls (1998–2005), character designer and art director
 Samurai Jack (2001–2004, 2017), character designer and art director
 Star Wars: Clone Wars (2003–2005), art director
 Korgoth of Barbaria (2006)
 3 Dog Band: Get It Together (2009), director
 Sym-Bionic Titan (2010–2011), co-creator and character designer
 My Little Pony: Friendship Is Magic (2010–2011), first and second season opener, development artist
 Mickey Mouse (2013–2019), developer, director, writer, animation department, and voice actor
 The Wonderful World of Mickey Mouse (2020–present), developer, director, writer, and voice actor

Awards
Rudish has received a number of Emmy and Annie award nominations, winning three Emmys and one Annie. He shared Emmy wins for Outstanding Animated Program (For Programming One Hour or More) in 2004 and '05 for Star Wars: Clone Wars miniseries with that show's production staff, also earning nominations for Dexter's Laboratory and Samurai Jack. In 2013 he won for Outstanding Short-Format Animated Program for the Mickey Mouse episode "Croissant de Triomphe". 

In 1997, Rudish shared an Individual Achievement: Writing in a TV Production Annie with Jason Butler Rote for the Dexter's Laboratory episode "The Beard to Be Feared". He also received Annie nominations in 1994 for Best Individual Achievement for Artistic Excellence in the Field of Animation for an episode of 2 Stupid Dogs and in 2003 for Outstanding Character Design in an Animated Television Production for The Powerpuff Girls episode "Members Only".

References

External links
 
 Biography at StarWars.com
  (father) 

1968 births
Animators from Mississippi
People from Tupelo, Mississippi
Prop designers
American storyboard artists
American art directors
American television directors
American male voice actors
American production designers
American television writers
American male television writers
American television producers
American animated film producers
California Institute of the Arts alumni
Living people
Primetime Emmy Award winners
Annie Award winners
Cartoon Network Studios people
Hanna-Barbera people
Disney Television Animation people